Jean-Yves Leroux (born June 24, 1976) is a Canadian former professional ice hockey forward.

Biography
Leroux was born in Montreal, Quebec. As a youth, he played in the 1989 and 1990 Quebec International Pee-Wee Hockey Tournaments with a minor ice hockey team from Montreal.

Leroux started his National Hockey League (NHL) career with the Chicago Blackhawks in the 1996–97 NHL season. He spent his entire NHL career with the Hawks. He left the NHL after the 2000–01 NHL season.

References

External links

1976 births
Beauport Harfangs players
Chicago Blackhawks draft picks
Chicago Blackhawks players
Chicago Wolves players
Canadian ice hockey forwards
French Quebecers
Ice hockey people from Montreal
Indianapolis Ice players
Living people
Norfolk Admirals players
Pont Rouge Lois Jeans players
Quebec RadioX players